{{Speciesbox
| image = Tropidophora desmazuresi (MNHN-IM-2000-5460).jpeg
| image_caption = Shell of † Tropidophora desmazuresi (syntype at MNHN, Paris)
| status = EX
| status_system = IUCN2.3
| status_ref = 
| taxon = Tropidophora desmazuresi
| authority =  (Crosse, 1873)
| synonyms = C'Cyclostoma desmazuresi Crosse, 1873 ·  (original combination)
}}Tropidophora desmazuresi'' was a species of land snail with an operculum, a terrestrial gastropod mollusk in the family Pomatiidae.

Description
The length of the shell attains 9.2 mm.

Distribution
This species was endemic to Mauritius. It is now extinct.

References

 Crosse, H., 1874. Faune malacologique terrestre et fluviatile de l'ile de Rodriguez. Journal de Conchyliologie 22: 220-242
  Fischer-Piette, E., 1950. Liste des types décrits dans le Journal de Conchyliologie et conservés dans la collection de ce journal (avec planches)(suite). Journal de Conchyliologie 90: 65-82
 Griffiths, O.L. & Florens, V.F.B. (2006). A field guide to the non-marine molluscs of the Mascarene Islands (Mauritius, Rodrigues and Réunion) and the northern dependencies of Mauritius. Bioculture Press: Mauritius. Pp. i–xv, 1–185.

External links
 Crosse H. (1873). Diagnoses molluscorum novorum. Journal de Conchyliologie. 21(2): 136-144

Tropidophora
Extinct gastropods
Taxonomy articles created by Polbot